The International Lightweight Tag Team Championship is a professional wrestling tag team title in Japanese promotion Pro Wrestling Zero1, contested exclusively among junior heavyweight (<) wrestlers. It was created on December 26, 2003 when Ikuto Hidaka and Dick Togo defeated Naohiro Hoshikawa and Tatsuhito Takaiwa in a tournament final. This was during a time when Zero1 (then known as Pro Wrestling Zero-One) was a member of the National Wrestling Alliance; since the two organizations' parting in late 2004, the NWA does not recognize or sanction it, though it retains the NWA initials. It is one of two tag team titles in Zero1, along with the NWA Intercontinental Tag Team Championship, typically contested among heavyweights. There have been a total of 39 recognized individual champions and 28 recognized teams, who have had a combined 31 official reigns.

Title history

Combined reigns

By team

By individual

See also
List of National Wrestling Alliance championships

References

External links
ZEROONEUSA.com title history
Wrestling-Titles.com title history
TitleHistories.com title history

Pro Wrestling Zero1 championships
Tag team wrestling championships
Lightweight wrestling championships
International professional wrestling championships